Ralph Rhein (born 31 January 1965) is a Swiss slalom canoeist who competed from the mid-1980s to the mid-1990s. He finished 32nd in the K-1 event at the 1992 Summer Olympics in Barcelona.

References
Sports-Reference.com profile

1965 births
Canoeists at the 1992 Summer Olympics
Living people
Olympic canoeists of Switzerland
Swiss male canoeists
Place of birth missing (living people)